National Secondary Route 128, or just Route 128 (or ) is a National Road Route of Costa Rica, located in the Heredia province.

Description
In Heredia province the route covers Barva canton (San Pedro, San Pablo, San Roque districts), Santa Bárbara canton (Santa Bárbara, Jesús districts).

References

Highways in Costa Rica